Integrin alpha-9 is a protein that in humans is encoded by the ITGA9 gene. Cytogenetic location: 3p22.2

Function 

This gene encodes an alpha integrin. Integrins are heterodimeric integral membrane glycoproteins composed of an alpha chain and a beta chain that mediate cell-cell and cell-matrix adhesion. The protein encoded by this gene, when bound to the beta 1 chain, forms an integrin that is a receptor for tenascin-C, VCAM1 and osteopontin. Expression of this gene has been found to be upregulated in small cell lung cancers.

Interactions
The α9 subunit forms a heterodimeric complex with a β1 subunit to form the α9β1 integrin. This integrin participates in cell adhesion with various ligands in the extracellular matrix (ECM), including extra domain A (EDA) fibronectin, tenascin-C, ADAMs, EMELIN1, osteopontin, and VEGF. α9β1 binding is independent of the RGD peptide sequence.

References

Further reading

External links
ITGA9 Info with links in the Cell Migration Gateway 

Integrins